The Port of Mangalia is situated on the Black Sea, located in the city of Mangalia close to the southern border with Bulgaria, and over 260 km north of Istanbul. It covers 142.19 ha of which 27.47 ha is land and 114.72 ha is water.

The combined length of the north and south breakwaters is 2.74 km. There are 4 berths totaling 540 meters in length, 2 of which are operational. Maximum depth is 9 meters.

The Port of Mangalia is mainly used by the Constanța Shipyard.

See also
Mangalia Marina

References

Ports and harbours of Romania
Mangalia